The 2007 Dunlop MSA British Touring Car Championship season was the 50th British Touring Car Championship (BTCC) season.  It was won by Fabrizio Giovanardi with 10 race wins and 17 podiums.  Going into the final race, Fabrizio Giovanardi was one point behind Jason Plato but a second place for Giovanardi and a fourth place for Plato resulted in Giovanardi taking the championship by 3 points.  The Teams' championship was won by SEAT Sport UK, the Manufacturers' championship was won by Vauxhall, the Independents' Trophy was won by Colin Turkington and the Independent Teams' championship was won by Team RAC.

Changes for 2007

Teams and drivers
After two unhappy seasons with the Astra Sport Hatch, the Triple 8-run works Vauxhall team switched to an all-new chassis based on the Vectra C built to the now-prevalent Super 2000 rules, retaining Italian veteran Fabrizio Giovanardi and young Englishman Tom Chilton as they sought to reassert their supremacy from the first half of the decade.

Reigning Manufacturers champions SEAT were again their only works opposition. Jason Plato remained on board as team leader and GT racer Darren Turner, who had shared the second Leon with James Thompson during 2006, stepped into the second seat full-time. With their Manufacturers title fight going down to the final rounds at Thruxton, both Vauxhall and SEAT added third cars to their line-ups for the closing meeting. Double champion Alain Menu, who had been racing for Vauxhall's sister marque Chevrolet in the World Touring Car Championship, returned to the British series for the first time since 2000 to drive the Vectra, while Dutchman Tom Coronel, fresh from claiming the WTCC Independents title at the wheel of a Leon, bolstered the SEAT charge.

After winning the Teams, Drivers and Independents titles for two straight years with their Integra, Team Dynamics (again under the Team Halfords banner) switched to another self-developed Honda chassis, this time built to Super 2000 specifications and based on the Civic. Reigning double champion Matt Neal stayed with his family team, with Gordon Shedden partnering him for a second year. The Dynamics cars were no longer eligible for Independents points due to their dominance of that championship in the previous two years.

Also changing machinery were West Surrey Racing (once again entered as Team RAC), who traded their venerable MGs for a pair of Super 2000-spec BMW 320si's acquired from BMW's works WTCC squads. Long-time collaborator Colin Turkington again headed the line-up, joined by reigning Renault Clio Cup champion Tom Onslow-Cole. Also running a 320si was former Production class race winner and reigning SEAT Cupra Cup champion Mat Jackson, making his debut in the top class of the BTCC with his family Jacksons M.Sport team.

Team Eurotech continued to run their ex-Dynamics Integra for team boss Mike Jordan for a second season, while Motorbase Performance abandoned their Integra and expanded to two ex-works Super 2000 SEAT Toledos, having run one in the closing rounds of 2006. Gareth Howell, who had raced a third Dynamics Integra in the latter stages of both 2005 and 2006, joined the team alongside former Clio Cup and British GT race-winner Matt Allison. Howell ran out of budget mid-season and was replaced first by Tom Ferrier, who had driven the car in 2006, and for the final round by ex-Vauxhall works driver Paul O'Neill.

WTCC Independent squad GR Asia also ran a Toledo for their expansion into the British championship, missing two rounds when their WTCC commitments left them unable to attend. The car was piloted by Adam Jones who had an impressive debut season in the BTCC aboard Xero Competition's Lexus the previous year. The team then added a Leon to their stable for the final three meetings. Former works Vauxhall driver Gavin Smith was behind the wheel for the first two, being replaced in the final round by the returning Rob Collard, who had abandoned his planned switch to the Porsche Carrera Cup Great Britain earlier in the season after a handful of races.

Quest Racing returned to the championship for a full campaign having joined the field in the second half of 2006, again fielding Irish youngster Eoin Murray in an ex-WTCC Alfa Romeo 156. The 156 was also the vehicle of choice for the brand-new A-Tech squad, with veteran
David Pinkney joining the team from Motorbase alongside Richard Marsh, who had appeared in a Peugeot 307 for Team Griffin Racing the previous year.

Other returning independents included Kartworld Racing, who expanded a second ex-WSR MG ZS, with Fiona Leggate joining the team to partner team boss Jason Hughes after two years in a bio-ethanol powered Vauxhall Astra Coupe with Tech-Speed Motorsport, and BTC Racing, who took in a full season with their Lexus IS200s after debuting in the final two rounds of 2006. Chris Stockton remained from the previous year, and was joined by Nick Leason, who initially planned to run an Astra Coupe for Daniels Motorsport as he had done in the latter stages of 2006. Leason left the team after the first three meetings with the team cutting down to one car for Stockton.

Tech-Speed swapped the Astra Coupe for a newer Sport Hatch driven by former Turkish touring car champion Erkut Kizilirmak, who had trialed the car through two appearances for the works Vauxhall squad the previous year, while the list of returnees was completed by Geoff Steel Racing, who again ran Martyn Bell in their older-spec BMW 320i. A 320i was also purchased by former Dutch Supercar Challenge racer Jim Pocklington to race with his own J Team Motorsport squad in the first half of the year.

John George returned to the series for the first time since 2004 in an ex-Dynamics Integra run by former Production class entrant TH Motorsport, with club saloon driver Simon Blanckley also plumping for an Integra in his debut season in the category, running for his own Sibsport team with support from touring car preparation expert Graham Hathaway. Another Integra was entered for the final two rounds by Robertshaw Racing for Alan Taylor, with both team and driver stepping up from the Clio Cup.

The most ambitious of the year's new entries came from the tiny Team AFM Racing outfit, who fielded a self-built BMW 120d, the championship's first ever diesel-powered car, for team boss and long-time production BMW racer Rick Kerry.

Other changes
 In October 2005 Alan Gow announced that the 2007 championship will be contested by cars complying with the FIA's Super 2000 specification regulations.
 Cars built and raced to BTC-specification were still permitted to compete, although were ineligible for outright championship honours.
 The series had live coverage on ITV's digital channels for the first half of the season, returning to ITV1 for the final five race weekends. Full day's coverage (including support races) moved from MotorsTV to Setanta Sports.

Entry list
The official entry list was published on 13 March 2007 following Media Day at Rockingham

 Team Halfords were neither a works or an independent entry.

Race results
All races were held in the United Kingdom. The 2007 season again had ten race weekends with three BTCC rounds at each.

Final championship standings

No driver may collect more than one "Lead a Lap" point per race no matter how many laps they lead.
Race 1 polesitter receives 1 point.

Drivers' Championship

Note: bold signifies pole position (1 point given in first race only, and race 2 and 3 poles are based on race results), italics signifies fastest lap (1 point given all races) and * signifies at least one lap in the lead (1 point given all races).

Manufacturers Championship

Teams Championship

Note – * denotes engine change penalty

Independents Trophy

Independent Teams Championship

Note – * denotes engine change penalty

References

2007 Season
Touring Car Championship